Polydore (Polydorus) is an opera by the French-Italian composer Jean-Baptiste Stuck, first performed at the Académie Royale de Musique (the Paris Opera) on 15 February 1720. It takes the form of a tragédie en musique in a prologue and five acts. The libretto, by Simon-Joseph Pellegrin, is based on the Greek legend of Polydorus, youngest son of King Priam of Troy, murdered by Polymestor, King of Thrace, for his treasure.

Recording
Polydore - Judith van Wanroij, Helene Guilmette, Tassis Christoyannis, Thomas Dolie, Purcell Choir, Orfeo Orchestra, György Vashegyi 3CD Glossa 2023

Sources
 Félix Clément and Pierre Larousse Dictionnaire des Opéras, Paris, 1881, page 537.

French-language operas
Tragédies en musique
Operas by Jean-Baptiste Stuck
Operas
1720 operas